Breaking the Magician's Code: Magic's Biggest Secrets Finally Revealed is a series of television shows in which the methods behind magic tricks and illusions are explained. In its original incarnation there were four shows in 1997–1998 and a special in 2002 broadcast on the Fox network in the United States, and on Sky and ITV in the United Kingdom. In 2008–2009, a new series of thirteen shows was broadcast by MyNetworkTV in the United States and ITV4 in the United Kingdom. On May 1, 2012, reruns of the first season began airing on BIO in the United States.

Cast
The first four specials and the full series featured incognito magician Val Valentino as the Masked Magician performing large-scale illusions and a few smaller-scale close up magic tricks before revealing the secrets of the tricks.

The performers for the 1997–1998 specials were Sybil Azur, Michelle Berube, Marisa Gilliam, Denise Holland, Kelly Danielle Jones, Jennifer Keyes, Diane Klimaszewski, Elaine Klimaszewski, and Elizabeth Ramos.

The show returned for a special in 2002.  Kimi Bateman, Kelly Cooper, Noelle Naone, and Kadee Sweeney performed with the magician (who, for this iteration of the show, was not Valentino, but instead an unknown performer).
A 13-part series was televised across 2008 and 2009.  Allie Cohen, Lyndsay Haldorson, Samantha Faye Lee, and Lauren Melendez were the principal performers.

The original series was presented by actor Mitch Pileggi. In the fifth special, Pileggi was replaced by narrator Mark Thompson, who served as the introducer for all the other episodes. Pileggi returned for the revived series where he solely serves as narrator.

Episodes

Production
The series is made by production company Nash Entertainment. The title alluded to the magician's code: the promise by working magicians not to reveal the basis of their tricks, or else risk getting blackballed by fellow magicians. The first special, which aired in November 1997, scored the highest ratings for any Fox special to that point; another three specials were broadcast through 1998. Fox returned on May 15, 2002, with Breaking the Magician's Code: Magic's Biggest Secrets Finally Revealed 5. A new magician was wearing a new mask with artificial hair, and a purple glistening outfit. It was never revealed who portrayed the magician in this episode.

MyNetworkTV bought thirteen new episodes for broadcast in the U.S. starting in the fall of 2008, with the first episode shown on October 2. They were shot at 516 South Anderson Street in Los Angeles, during the summer of 2008. The assistants learned the illusion the same day they shot it and filmed four to six illusions per day. These specials were also shown on TVB Pearl in Hong Kong, with the first episode shown on June 13, 2010. Valentino was credited as a producer and Mitch Pileggi returned as narrator, although he did not appear on camera. The show also aired in the UK on ITV4, and in Australia on 7Two with new narration by Grant Denyer. WWE divas Maria Kanellis and Eve Torres appeared in the first episode as part of a trick.

There is an Australian version of the show that first aired at 7:30 Monday, June 14, 2010, on Network Seven and has changed to Sundays at 6:30 on 7Two. This is the same show as the US version with some minor changes. This show also began to air on Australian pay television network Fox8 on Wednesday  September 21, 2011. This version is a duplicate of the American version. Since the first run of the series, the shows have been rerun many times on Sundays on Channel 7. The show also had a Portuguese adaptation in the public TV Channel SIC, essentially a duplicate of the American version only with a different Portuguese narrator.

References

External links

1990s American television series
2000s American television series
1997 American television series debuts
2002 American television series endings
2008 American television series debuts
2009 American television series endings
American television magic shows
Fox Broadcasting Company original programming
MyNetworkTV original programming
Television shows filmed in Los Angeles